Ropica latepubens is a species of beetle in the family Cerambycidae. It was described by Pic in 1951.

References

latepubens
Beetles described in 1951